Tikdar-e Pay Sang (also Romanized as Tīkdar-e Pāy Sang; also known as Nīk Darpāy-e Sang, Tīgdar-e Pāy Sang, Tīkdar Bāb Sang, and Tīkdar-e Bāb Sang) is a village in Derakhtengan Rural District, in the Central District of Kerman County, Kerman Province, Iran. At the 2006 census, its population was 86, in 24 families.

References 

Populated places in Kerman County